Grimberg is a toponymic surname. Notable people with the surname include:

Anders Grimberg, Swedish football manager 
Arenda Grimberg (born 1978), Dutch cyclist
Carl Grimberg (1875–1941), Swedish historian
Fabian Grimberg (born 1962), Argentine football player
Steven D. Grimberg (born 1974), American judge 
Tina Grimberg (born 1963), Ukrainian-born Canadian rabbi
Vanessa Grimberg (born 1993), German swimmer

See also
:nl:Grimberg, a manor near Almelo, Netherlands
Grimberg, a former village, now central neighborhood of Lohmar, North Rhine-Westphalia
Port Grimberg, named after the nearby former Castle Grimberg, North Rhine-Westphalia
Grimbergen, Belgium
Grinberg (surname)